Fabienne Berthaud (born in 1966, Gap) is a French writer, actress, screenwriter and director, winner of the 2011 prix Françoise Sagan.

Works

Bibliography 
1994: Cafard, Albin Michel
1999: Mal partout, Éditions du Seuil
1999: Moi, par exemple, 
2004: Pieds nus sur les limaces, Seuil
2011: Un jardin sur le ventre, éd. JBZ et Cie.

Filmography

Director 
 1998: Noël en famille, short film
 1999: « Chair en vie », épisode of the serial Chambre n° 13.
 2005: Franckie, feature film.
 2010:  (Lily Sometimes), feature film.
 2015: Sky, feature film
 2016: Some Needs, Clip by Rover Guest Diane Kruger
 2019: , feature film

Actress 
 1993:  by

References

External links 
 
 Le tandem Diane Kruger-Fabienne Berthaud à son meilleur on L'Express (14 September 2015)
 Fabienne Berthaud on Première
 Fabienne Berthaud sur le site Ina.fr

1966 births
Living people
20th-century French non-fiction writers
21st-century French non-fiction writers
French women film directors
French women screenwriters
French screenwriters
French film actresses
People from Hautes-Alpes
20th-century French women writers
21st-century French women writers